This is a list of Chinese football transfers for the 2011 season summer transfer window. Only moves from Super League and League One are listed.

Super League

Beijing Guoan

In:

 
 

Out:

Changchun Yatai

In:

Out:

Chengdu Blades

In:

Out:

Dalian Shide

In:

Out:

Guangzhou Evergrande

In:

Out:

Hangzhou Greentown

In:

Out:

Henan Construction

In:

Out:

Jiangsu Sainty

In:

Out:

Liaoning Whowin

In:

Out:

Nanchang Hengyuan

In:

Out:

Qingdao Jonoon

In:

Out:

Shaanxi Baorong Chanba

In:

Out:

Shandong Luneng

In:

Out:

Shanghai Shenhua

In:

Out:

Shenzhen Ruby

In:

Out:

Tianjin Teda

In:

Out:

League One

Beijing Baxy

In:

Out:

Beijing Technology

In:

Out:

Chongqing Lifan

In:

Out:

Dalian Aerbin

In:

Out:

Guangdong Sunray Cave

In:

Out:

Guizhou Zhicheng

In:

Out:

Hunan Billows

In:

Out:

Hubei Wuhan Zhongbo

In:

Out:

Shanghai East Asia

In:

Out:

Shenyang Dongjin

In:

Out:

Shenzhen Phoenix

In:

Out:

Tianjin Runyulong

In:

Out:

Tianjin Songjiang

In:

Out:

Yanbian Changbai Tiger

In:

Out:

References

China
2011